"Doppelgangland" is the sixteenth episode of the third season of the fantasy television series Buffy the Vampire Slayer (1997–2003). It was written and directed by the show's creator, Joss Whedon, and originally aired on The WB Television Network in the United States on February 23, 1999. The episode's title is derived from the term "Doppelgänger", a German word for a lookalike or double of a living person.

"Doppelgangland" revisits the alternate reality portrayed in "The Wish", in which Buffy never arrived in Sunnydale and vampires ruled the city. Anya, a vengeance demon who previously granted the wish, attempts a spell to regain her powers.

Plot
Anya unsuccessfully entreats D'Hoffryn to restore her demonic powers.

Principal Snyder browbeats Willow into tutoring basketball star Percy West. At Giles's request, Willow hacks into Mayor Wilkins's files; when Faith finds out, she alerts him of the intrusion. The Mayor presents Faith with a fully furnished apartment and then tells her he plans to have Willow killed.

Percy makes it clear that his idea of tutoring is that Willow should do his homework, and Willow does not correct him. Frustrated and unhappy, Willow then quarrels with Buffy and Xander and storms off. Willow assists Anya with a spell, but their conjuration goes awry, retrieving Vampire Willow from Cordelia's previous wish that Buffy never came to Sunnydale moments before this reality's erasure rather than retrieving the magic amulet Anya sought. Neither Anya nor Willow realize the consequences of their spell.

Vampire Willow sees Sunnydale is a lot different. No one is afraid of her and there are more humans than vampires, which means the city is very peaceful and corruption-free. Vampire Willow goes to the Bronze, where she fights with Percy and throwing him across the pool table. Vampire Willow runs into her old lover Xander and realizes that he is alive. She also sees Buffy who is alive and despises her a lot worse. She shows her vampire face to Xander and Buffy. Two vampires sent by the Mayor attack her, but she turns them to her side. Buffy and Xander tell Giles that Willow has been killed and turned vampire, but the genuine Willow arrives to demonstrate their error. None of them are aware of Vampire Willow's true origins.

Angel and Anya drop into the Bronze. Vampire Willow and her new minions arrive and capture the crowd. Angel escapes to find Buffy. Anya recognizes what has happened, offers to restore Vampire Willow to her own world in return for help in retrieving her amulet, and suggests capturing the other Willow to assist in the spell. Angel, Buffy and Xander head for the Bronze, but Willow turns back to get the tranquilizer gun and is grabbed by her doppelganger. Willow manages to shoot the vampire with the tranquilizer gun. The others arrive back in the library and they lock the unconscious vampire in the library cage, then Willow exchanges clothes with her in an attempt to pass herself off as Vampire Willow. They return to the Bronze.

Cordelia arrives at the library and unwittingly releases Vampire Willow, who immediately attacks her, but Wesley intervenes and drives the vampire away. At the Bronze, although Anya exposes Willow's disguise, Buffy defeats the other vampires, then captures the returning doppelganger. Anya returns vampire Willow to her own timeline, where the alternate Oz immediately kills her before the reality erases. The next day, Percy, thoroughly intimidated by Willow's doppelganger (and believing she was the real Willow), shows up for tutoring with all his work completed and makes it clear he intends to please her from now on.

Reception
When the episode was originally broadcast in the United States on February 23, 1999, it received a Nielsen rating of 4.1. It was the second most watched program of the week on The WB Television Network.

Noel Murray from The A.V. Club commented that the episode "is terrific on myriad levels, from the dialogue to the plot twists to the multiple spot-on character moments. But mostly it's a top-drawer episode for the way it binds the Buffyverse together, by demonstrating how adept the writing staff is at remembering everything they've done on the show before, and re-using the elements that still have plenty of juice in them."

"Doppelgangland" primarily focuses on the character Willow. Series creator Joss Whedon has placed it fifth in his list of favorite episodes from the show, stating "one Willow is certainly not enough." Malinda Lo from AfterEllen.com included the episode in her top ten as well. Alyson Hannigan, who portrays the character Willow, also considers the episode to be one of her favorites in the series. According to TV.com, the episode holds an average score of 9.5/10, based on 658 compiled ratings.

References

Bibliography
 Kaveney, Roz (ed.) (2004). Reading the Vampire Slayer: The New, Updated, Unofficial Guide to Buffy and Angel, Tauris Parke Paperbacks.

External links

 
 "Doppelgangland" at the BBC
 "Doppelgangland" at BuffyGuide.com

Buffy the Vampire Slayer (season 3) episodes
1999 American television episodes
American LGBT-related television episodes
Mass media portrayals of bisexuality
Television episodes about parallel universes
Television episodes written by Joss Whedon
Television episodes directed by Joss Whedon